Rui Silva may refer to:

Rui Silva (runner) (born 1977), Portuguese athlete
Rui Pedro Silva (born 1977), Portuguese football manager
Rui Pedro Silva (born 1981), Portuguese athlete
Rui Silva (handballer) (born 1993), Portuguese handballer
Rui Silva (footballer, born 1994), Portuguese footballer who plays as a goalkeeper
Rui Silva (footballer, born 1996), Portuguese footballer who plays as a defender